Justin Johnson (born January 3, 1977) is an American baseball coach and former outfielder, who is the current head baseball coach of the UC Riverside Highlanders. He played college baseball at Mt. San Antonio College for coach Art Mazmanian from 1996 to 1997. He has also been the head coach of the Saint Katherine Firebirds (2014).

Playing career
Johnson attended Diamond Bar High School in Diamond Bar, California. As a senior in 1995, Johnson was drafted in the 43rd round of the 1995 Major League Baseball draft.

Coaching career
When Troy Percival resigned as head baseball coach at UC Riverside, Johnson was named the interim head coach for the 2021 season. On November 4, 2021, Johnson was promoted to head coach.

Head coaching record

References

External links

 UC Riverside Highlanders bio

Mt. SAC Mounties baseball players
High school baseball coaches in the United States
Caltech Beavers baseball coaches
UC Riverside Highlanders baseball coaches
Baseball players from California
Baseball outfielders
1977 births
Living people
Baseball coaches from California